Boris Moiseevich Frumin (born 24 October 1947) is a Soviet, American and Latvian film director and screenwriter.

Career
Frumin's film Errors of Youth was screened in the Un Certain Regard section at the 1989 Cannes Film Festival. His project Siberian Triangle was presented at the 32nd Moscow International Film Festival. Frumin is an associate professor at NYU's Tisch School of the Arts, where he shares his passion for neo-realism and Eastern European film.

Filmography
 Diary of a School Director (1975)
 Family Melodrama (1976)
 Errors of Youth (1978)
 Black and White (1992)
 Viva Castro! (1994)
 Nelegal (2006)
 Street Days (2010)
 Blind Dates (2013)
 Blizzard of Souls (2019; screenwriter)

References

External links

1947 births
Living people
Latvian film directors
Latvian screenwriters
Artists from Riga
Soviet film directors